Ginestra is a surname. Notable people with the surname include:

Ciro Ginestra (born 1978), Italian footballer and manager
Paolo Ginestra (born 1979), Italian footballer